Sir Samuel McCaughey (1 July 1835 – 25 July 1919) was an Irish-born pastoralist, politician and philanthropist in Australia.

Early life
McCaughey was born on 1 July 1835 at Tullynewey, near Ballymena, Ireland, the son of Francis McCaughey, farmer and merchant, and his wife Eliza, née Wilson.

McCaughey came to Australia with an uncle, Charles Wilson, a brother of Sir Samuel Wilson and landed at Melbourne in April 1856. He immediately went to the country and began working as a jackaroo, in three months was appointed an overseer, and two years later became manager of Kewell station while his uncle was on a visit to England.

Career
In 1860, after his uncle's return, he acquired an interest in Coonong station near Urana with two partners. His brother John, who came out later, became a partner in other stations.

During the early days of Coonong station McCaughey suffered greatly from drought conditions, but overcame these by sinking bores for artesian water and constructing large tanks and so was a pioneer of water-conservation in Australia.

In 1871 McCaughey was away from Australia for two years on holiday, and on his return did much experimenting in sheep-breeding, at first seeking the strains that could produce the best wool in the Riverina district, and afterwards when the mutton trade developed considering the question from that angle.

In 1880 when Sir Samuel Wilson went to England, McCaughey bought two of his stations, Toorale and Dunlop Stations. McCaughey then owned about 3,000,000 acres (12,000 km²). In 1886 when he again visited the old world he imported a considerable number of Vermont sheep from the United States, and he also introduced fresh strains from Tasmania.

In 1900 McCaughey bought North Yanco and at great cost constructed about 200 miles of channels and irrigated 40,000 acres (160 km²). The success of this scheme is believed to have encouraged the New South Wales government to proceed with the dam at Burrinjuck.

McCaughey had become a member of the New South Wales Legislative Council in 1899, and in 1905 he was made a Knight Bachelor. McCaughey suffered from nephritis and he died from heart failure at Yanco on 25 July 1919 and was buried in the grounds of St John's Presbyterian Church in Narrandera. He never married.

Death and legacy
McCaughey died at Yanco on 25 July 1919.

He was a generous philanthropist; he donated £10,000 to the Dreadnought Fund, £10,000 to Dr Barnardo's Homes, gave liberally to the Red Cross and other war charities besides insuring 500 soldiers at £200 each.

After his death, his estate was sworn for probate at over £1,600,000. Apart from bequests of £200,000 and all his motor vehicles to his brother John and legacies to his station managers and employees, he left £10,000 to increase the stipends of Presbyterian clergy, £20,000 to the Burnside Orphan Homes at Parramatta, £20,000 to Scots College in Sydney, £10,000 each to five other independent schools (Newington College, Sydney Church of England Grammar School, Sydney Grammar School, Cranbrook School, Sydney and The King's School, Parramatta),  £5000 to the Salvation Army and £5000 each to seven hospitals.

Half the residue of his estate went to the University of Sydney (£458,000 from which nine chairs were created, including the McCaughey Chair of French) and to the University of Queensland. The other half went to the relief of members of the Australian Military and Naval Expeditionary Forces and their widows and children.

His portrait by John Longstaff is in the Great Hall of the University of Sydney.

Yanco Agricultural High School
One of the schools which directly bears his legacy is Yanco Agricultural High School, located near Leeton, New South Wales. This school was founded around a building built by McCaughey to host The Duke of York during a planned visit to Australia. A life-size portrait of McCaughey is in the entry to this building.

McCaughey Chair of French
The following professors occupied this chair at Sydney University:
 George Gibb Nicholson, 1921–45
 Ian Allan Ramie Henning, 1945–70
 Leigh Ross Chambers, 1971–75
 Ian Peter Barko, 1976–90
 Angus Andrews Martin, 1992–99
 Margaret Sankey, 2003-

Family
His brother John, also a pastoralist, has an art prize in his name: the John McCaughey Memorial Art Prize was set up by his widow Mona in 1957.

References

Further reading
 
 
 

1835 births
1919 deaths
Members of the New South Wales Legislative Council
Irish emigrants to colonial Australia
Australian Knights Bachelor
People from Ballymena
Settlers of Australia
19th-century Australian philanthropists
19th-century Australian businesspeople
Australian stockmen